Cyberdyne may refer to:
Cyberdyne Inc., a Japanese company which sells a powered exoskeleton called HAL 5 (Hybrid Assistive Limb)
Cyberdyne (Cyber Dynamics Systems Corporation), a fictional corporation that created the Skynet system in the Terminator franchise
Cyberdyne, the name of a fictional manufacturer in the anime Hand Maid May

See also
Cyberdyne Ibaraki Robots, a Japanese professional basketball team
Norton Cyberdyne from the 1990 B horror/science fiction film Syngenor